Lepakshi is a village in the Sri Sathya Sai district of Andhra Pradesh, India.

References

External links 

  The hanging pillar and other wonders of Lepakshi

Hindu temples in Andhra Pradesh
Villages in Sri Sathya Sai district
Mandal headquarters in Sri Sathya Sai district